EcoDynamics is an energy efficient subbrand of Kia Motors introduced with the Ray concept car at the 2010 Chicago Auto Show.

References

External links 
 AutoWeek, Kia looks to the future with Ray plug-in hybrid concept

Kia Motors
Car manufacturers of South Korea
South Korean brands